Amblythyreus is a genus of ambush bugs (Reduviidae: Phymatinae) found mainly in Asia with about 16 species. They are predators that lie in wait mainly in flowers, capturing prey using their forelegs.

Species in the genus include:
 Amblythyreus angustus
 Amblythyreus chapa
 Amblythyreus esakii
 Amblythyreus fasciatus
 Amblythyreus gestroi
 Amblythyreus intermedius
 Amblythyreus iranicus
 Amblythyreus izzardi
 Amblythyreus martini
 Amblythyreus oberthueri
 Amblythyreus potaninae
 Amblythyreus quadratus
 Amblythyreus rectus
 Amblythyreus rhombiventris
 Amblythyreus stali
 Amblythyreus taiwanus

References

Hemiptera genera
Reduviidae